Atherigona punctata, the Coimbatore wheat stem fly, is a species of fly in the family Muscidae. In South India, it is a pest of the wheat plant, Triticum aestivum.

References

Muscidae
Insect pests of millets